Dominic Samuel can refer to:

Dominic Samuel (English footballer) (born April 1994), English professional soccer player who plays striker
Dominic Samuel (Canadian soccer) (born September 1994), Canadian professional soccer player who plays defender